The 2019–20 North Alabama Lions men's basketball team represented the University of North Alabama in the 2019–20 NCAA Division I men's basketball season. The Lions, led by second-year head coach Tony Pujol, played their home games at Flowers Hall in Florence, Alabama as members of the Atlantic Sun Conference. They finished the season 13–17, 8–8 in ASUN play to finish in fifth place. They lost in the quarterfinals of the ASUN tournament to Stetson.

This season will mark North Alabama's second of a four-year transition period from Division II to Division I As a result, the Lions are not eligible for NCAA postseason play but can participate in the ASUN tournament. They could also play in the CIT or CBI, if invited.

Previous season
The Lions finished the 2018–19 season 	10–22 overall, 7–9 in ASUN play to finish in a tie for sixth place. In the ASUN tournament, they were defeated by North Florida in the quarterfinals.

Roster

Schedule and results 

|-
!colspan=9 style=| Non-conference regular season

|-
!colspan=9 style=| Atlantic Sun Conference regular season

|-
!colspan=12 style=| Atlantic Sun tournament

Source

References

North Alabama Lions men's basketball seasons
North Alabama Lions
North Alabama Lions men's basketball
North Alabama Lions men's basketball